Christopher Mies (born 24 May 1989) is a professional German racing driver who currently competes for Audi Sport in GT3 series such as ADAC GT Masters and GT World Challenge Europe.

Career
Mies began his career in 2006 in the Toyota Yaris Cup Germany, followed in 2007 by the Ford Fiesta Cup Germany. While racing a Ford Fiesta ST he won Division 2 of the ADAC Procar Series in 2008. In the same year he also moved into GT Racing for the first time, entering two races of the ADAC GT Masters in an Audi R8 LMS, thus beginning a long connection with the Audi brand. In 2009, he won his first major championship title, winning the FIA GT3 European Championship for Phoenix Racing with Christopher Haase, once again in an Audi R8 LMS. He moved to Abt Sportsline for the 2010 ADAC GT Masters season, finishing second in the championship. In 2011 he won the Bathurst 12 Hour for Joest Racing alongside Marc Basseng and Darryl O'Young. He repeated the achievement in 2012 with O'Young and Christer Jöns, this time for Phoenix Racing.

Mies went on to cement his rising reputation within GT3 ranks with a victory in the 2012 Blancpain Endurance Series. In 2013 and 2014, Mies raced in a diverse range of series and events, including largely unsuccessful returns to Bathurst and the Blancpain Endurance Series as well as appearances in the 24 Hours Nürburgring, Sepang 12 Hours and United SportsCar Championship. 2015 became Mies' most successful year to date, most notably winning the 24 Hours Nürburgring with Nico Müller, Edward Sandström and Laurens Vanthoor in the new Audi R8 LMS for Team WRT. He also continued his association with Australia through winning the Australian GT Championship, as well as the Australian Tourist Trophy, for Jamec Pem Racing and also finished second in the Highlands 101 for the team. In 2016 he continued in the Australian GT Championship as defending champion, once again with Jamec Pem Racing. He also continued in the Blancpain GT Series with Team WRT, finishing second in the series. With Connor De Phillippi, Mies won the 2016 ADAC GT Masters series.

In 2017 he won the 24 Hours Nürburgring for a second time with Kelvin van der Linde, Connor de Phillippi and Markus Winkelhock in a Land Motorsport Audi R8 LMS.

Mies returned to the GT World Challenge Europe in 2023, joining fellow factory drivers Simon Gachet and Patric Niederhauser in an Endurance Cup Pro class entry for Saintéloc Racing, as well as a Sprint Cup entry alongside Grégoire Demoustier.

References

External links
 Official site 
 
 

1989 births
Living people
People from Mettmann (district)
Sportspeople from Düsseldorf (region)
Racing drivers from North Rhine-Westphalia
German racing drivers
Blancpain Endurance Series drivers
ADAC GT Masters drivers
24 Hours of Daytona drivers
24H Series drivers
Audi Sport drivers
Abt Sportsline drivers
Team Joest drivers
WeatherTech SportsCar Championship drivers
W Racing Team drivers
Australian Endurance Championship drivers
DragonSpeed drivers
Phoenix Racing drivers
Nürburgring 24 Hours drivers
Saintéloc Racing drivers
Porsche Carrera Cup Germany drivers